Oleksandr Iosypovych Khotsianivskyi (born July 20, 1990 in Donetsk) is a Ukrainian freestyle wrestler, who competes in the men's super heavyweight category. He is two-time bronze European medalist and silver Universiade medalist. Khotsianivskyi represented Ukraine at the 2012 Summer Olympics in London, where he competed in the men's 120 kg category. He lost the qualifying round match to Turkey's Taha Akgül, who was able to score three points in two straight periods, leaving Khotsianivskyi without a single point.

He competed in the 125kg event at the 2022 World Wrestling Championships held in Belgrade, Serbia.

References

External links
NBC Olympics Profile
 

1990 births
Living people
Olympic wrestlers of Ukraine
Wrestlers at the 2012 Summer Olympics
Sportspeople from Donetsk
Ukrainian male sport wrestlers
Universiade medalists in wrestling
Universiade silver medalists for Ukraine
Wrestlers at the 2015 European Games
Wrestlers at the 2019 European Games
European Games medalists in wrestling
European Games bronze medalists for Ukraine
World Wrestling Championships medalists
European Wrestling Championships medalists
Medalists at the 2013 Summer Universiade
Wrestlers at the 2020 Summer Olympics
21st-century Ukrainian people